A Love Trilogy is the third studio album by American singer and songwriter Donna Summer. It was released on March 5, 1976, just eight months after her international breakthrough with the single and album of the same name – "Love to Love You Baby". The bold, sexual nature of that particular song had earned Summer the title 'the first lady of love'. By now Summer's work was being distributed in the U.S. by Casablanca Records, and the label encouraged Summer, Moroder and team to continue in this vein. A Love Trilogy uses the first side for one long disco track in three distinct movements 'Try Me', 'I Know', 'We Can Make It', and coalescing into the "love trilogy" of the title – "Try Me, I Know We Can Make It". Side two contained three additional erotic  disco songs, including a cover of Barry Manilow's "Could It Be Magic". The album's artwork showed Summer floating light-heartedly through the clouds, again adding to the image of her as a fantasy figure.

The album sold well across the world (it was her second consecutive album to be certified Gold in the United States) and again topped the national US Disco charts. Edited versions of "Try Me, I Know We Can Make It" and "Could It Be Magic" did not reach the top forty on the Billboard Hot 100, but the latter was a sizable R&B hit (#21) and disco hit (#3). Casablanca released a 12-inch version of "Try Me I Know We Can Make It" with "Love to Love You Baby" on the reverse side. The single "Could It Be Magic" was a Top 5 hit in the Netherlands.

The album did not fare so well in the UK where it reached only the no. 41 spot in September, some six months after its initial release. Likewise the single "Could It Be Magic" which only reached no. 40.

Track listing
All tracks produced by Pete Bellotte and Giorgio Moroder.

Personnel
Donna Summer – vocals
Giorgio Moroder – bass guitar, producer and synthesizer
Pete Bellotte – producer
Backing vocals: Madeline Bell, Sunny Leslie, Sue Glover (the Midnite Ladies)
Other musicians on this album were known collectively as "Munich Machine" and worked on a variety of Moroder/Bellotte productions from this period.
Munich Machine are: Thor Baldursson – keyboards, string arrangement, Frank Diez – guitar, Keith Forsey – drums, Martin Harrison – drums, Molly Moll – guitar, Gary Unwin – bass guitar, Les Hurdle  – bass guitar

Production
Producers: Giorgio Moroder, Pete Bellotte
Engineer: Jürgen Koppers, Mack & Hans
Musical arrangements: Giorgio Moroder and Thor Baldurson

Charts

Certifications and sales

References

External links
 

1979 albums
Donna Summer albums
1976 albums
Albums produced by Pete Bellotte
Albums produced by Giorgio Moroder